Pyromania is an impulse control disorder in which individuals repeatedly fail to resist impulses to deliberately start fires, to relieve some tension or for instant gratification. The term pyromania comes from the Greek word  (pyr, 'fire'). Pyromania is distinct from arson, the deliberate setting of fires for personal, monetary or political gain. Pyromaniacs start fires to release anxiety and tension, or for arousal. Other impulse disorders include kleptomania and intermittent explosive disorder.

There are specific symptoms that separate pyromaniacs from those who start fires for criminal purposes or due to emotional motivations not specifically related to fire. Someone with this disorder deliberately and purposely sets fires on more than one occasion, and before the act of lighting the fire the person usually experiences tension and an emotional buildup. When around fires, a person with pyromania gains intense interest or fascination and may also experience pleasure, gratification or relief. Another long term contributor often linked with pyromania is the buildup of stress. When studying the lifestyle of someone with pyromania, a buildup of stress and emotion is often evident and this is seen in teens' attitudes towards friends and family. At times it is difficult to distinguish the difference between pyromania and experimentation in childhood because both involve pleasure from the fire.

Classification

ICD
The World Health Organization's International Classification of Diseases (11th Revision) ICD-11, regarded as the global standard, was released in June 2018 and came into full effect from January 2022. It states the following about pyromania:

It also notes that pyromania has no relation to intellectual impairment, substance abuse, or other mental and behavioral disorder. ICD-11 was produced by professionals from 55 countries out of the 90 countries involved and is one of the most widely used reference worldwide by clinicians, with the other being the Diagnostic and Statistical Manual of Mental Disorders (DSM-5-TR from 2022, DSM-5 from 2013, or their predecessors)

DSM
The American Psychiatric Association's Diagnostic and Statistical Manual of Mental Disorders, First Edition, released in 1952, categorized pyromania as a subset of Obsessive–compulsive disorder. In the Second Edition, the disorder was dropped. In the Third Edition, it returned under the category of impulse-control disorders.

The Diagnostic and Statistical Manual of Mental Disorders, Fifth Edition, Text Revision (DSM-5-TR), released in 2022, states that the essential feature of pyromania is "the presence of multiple episodes of deliberate and purposeful fire setting." Pyromania moved from the DSM-4 chapter "Impulse-Control Disorders Not Otherwise Specified," to the chapter "Disruptive, impulse-control, and conduct disorders" in DSM-5.

Signs and symptoms
According to DSM-5, there are six signs of pyromania. Pyromania is mainly categorized by the purposeful setting of fire, tension or arousal before a fire is set, interest in or attraction to fire, and pleasure or relief after setting a fire. These fires not set for personal gain, are not meant to express anger or conceal illegal activity, are not in support of sociopolitical ideologies, are not in response to delusions, and are not signs of intellectual disability. For diagnosis, the setting of fire should not be better explained by a conduct disorder, manic episode, or a personality disorder (antisocial personality disorder). ICD-11 also adds substance abuse to this list. According to ICD-11, signs of fire setting may occur "in response to feelings of depressed mood, anxiety, boredom, loneliness, or other negative affective states." Those with pyromania exhibit problems in social environments and learning disabilities. Women pyromaniacs "often report histories of exposure to trauma, including sexual abuse, and self-harm." Episodic fire setting may become more intense and violent over time, becoming potentially chronic if untreated.

Causes
Most studied cases of pyromania occur in children and teenagers. There is a range of causes, but an understanding of the different motives and actions of fire setters can provide a platform for prevention. Common causes of pyromania can be broken down into two main groups: individual and environmental. This includes the complex understanding of factors such as individual temperament, parental psychopathology, and possible neurochemical predispositions. Many studies have shown that patients with pyromania were in households without a father figure present.

Pyromania can be common in those with substance use disorders, problem gambling, mood disorders, disruptive behaviour, anti-social disorders, and/or another impulse-control disorder.

Environmental 
Environmental factors that may lead to pyromania include an event that the patient has experienced in the environment they live in. Environmental factors include neglect from parents and physical or emotional abuse in earlier life. Other causes include early experiences of watching adults or teenagers using fire inappropriately and lighting fires as a stress reliever.

Treatment and prognosis
The appropriate treatment for pyromania varies with the age of the patient and the seriousness of the condition. For children and adolescents treatment usually is cognitive behavioral therapy sessions in which the patient's situation is diagnosed to find out what may have caused this impulsive behavior. Once the situation is diagnosed, repeated therapy sessions usually help continue to a recovery. Other important steps must be taken as well with the interventions and the cause of the impulse behavior. Some other treatments include parenting training, over-correction/satiation/negative practice with corrective consequences, behavior contracting/token reinforcement, special problem-solving skills training, relaxation training, covert sensitization, fire safety and prevention education, individual and family therapy, and medication. The prognosis for recovery in adolescents and children with pyromania depends on the environmental or individual factors in play, but is generally positive. Pyromania is generally harder to treat in adults, often due to lack of cooperation by the patient. Treatment usually consists of more medication to prevent stress or emotional outbursts, in addition to long-term psychotherapy. In adults, however, the recovery rate is generally poor, and if an adult does recover, it usually takes a longer period of time.

History
Pyromania was thought in the 1800s to be a concept involved with moral insanity and moral treatment, but had not been categorized under impulse control disorders. Pyromania is one of the four recognized types of arson, alongside burning for profit, to cover up an act of crime and for revenge. Pyromania is the second most common type of arson. Common synonyms for pyromaniacs in colloquial English include firebug (US) and fire raiser (UK), but these also refer to arsonists. Pyromania is a rare disorder with an incidence of less than one percent in most studies; also, pyromaniacs hold a very small proportion of psychiatric hospital admissions. Pyromania can occur in children as young as age three, though such cases are rare. Only a small percentage of children and teenagers arrested for arson are child pyromaniacs. A preponderance of the individuals are male; one source states that ninety percent of those diagnosed with pyromania are male. Based on a survey of 9,282 Americans using the Diagnostic and Statistical Manual of Mental Disorders, 4th edition, impulse-control problems such as gambling, pyromania and compulsive shopping collectively affect 9% of the population. A 1979 study by the Law Enforcement Assistance Administration found that only 14% of fires were started by pyromaniacs and others with mental illness. A 1951 study by Lewis and Yarnell, one of the largest epidemiological studies conducted, found that 39% of those who had intentionally set fires had been diagnosed with pyromania.

See also
 Child pyromaniac
 Macdonald triad
 Pyrophobia – the hatred or fear of fire
 Pyrophilia – arousal or sexual gratification involving fire

References

External links 

Fire
Habit and impulse disorders
Mania
Public safety